Wellington Carvalho dos Santos (born 15 February 1993) is a Brazilian footballer who plays as a centre-back for Liga 1 club Bali United.

References

Living people
1993 births
Brazilian footballers
Association football defenders
Campeonato Brasileiro Série A players
Campeonato Brasileiro Série B players
Campeonato Brasileiro Série C players
Liga 1 (Indonesia) players
Fluminense FC players
Ceará Sporting Club players
Tombense Futebol Clube players
Clube de Regatas Brasil players
Associação Atlética Ponte Preta players
Coritiba Foot Ball Club players
Bali United F.C. players
Expatriate footballers in Indonesia 
 Brazilian expatriate footballers
Brazilian expatriate sportspeople in Indonesia
Sportspeople from Rio de Janeiro (state)